Cunning Stunts is the sixth studio album by the progressive rock band Caravan, released in 1975. It was their first album with the  bass guitarist, vocalist and songwriter Mike Wedgwood. The title of the album is a spoonerism for "Stunning Cunts", which is typical of their cheeky use of language. Three previous Caravan albums with titles that are also sexual plays on words are If I Could Do It All Over Again, I'd Do It All Over You (1970), In the Land of Grey and Pink (1971) and For Girls Who Grow Plump in the Night (1973).

Reception

AllMusic described it as "a solid, varied, and interesting album with plenty of character."

Track listing
Side one

Side two

Bonus tracks

Personnel
Caravan
 Pye Hastings – electric guitar and acoustic guitars, vocals
 Dave Sinclair – piano, organ, synthesizer, keyboards, string co-arrangement on "No Backstage Pass", brass co-arrangement on "Ben Karratt Rides Again" and "Sneaking out the Bare Quare"
 Geoffrey  Richardson – viola, electric guitar, Western concert flute, flute, night-shift whistle
 Mike Wedgwood – bass guitar, congas, vocals, Moog brass on "Stuck in a Hole", string arrangement on "Lover" and "No Backstage Pass"
 Richard Coughlan – drums

Additional personnel
 Jimmy Hastings – brass arrangement on "Ben Karratt Rides Again" and "Sneaking out the Bare Quare"
 David Hitchcock – producer

Chart performance
In the USA, the album peaked #124 in the Billboard 200 album charts in 1975.

References

External links
 Caravan - Cunning Stunts (1975) album review by Lindsay Planer, credits & releases at AllMusic.com
 Caravan - Cunning Stunts (1975) album releases & credits at Discogs.com
 Caravan - Cunning Stunts (1975) album credits & user reviews at ProgArchives.com
 Caravan - Cunning Stunts (1975) album review at Calyx: the Canterbury Music Website
 Caravan - Cunning Stunts (1975) album to be listened as stream at Play.Spotify.com
 

Caravan (band) albums
1975 albums
Albums with cover art by Hipgnosis
Decca Records albums
Albums produced by Dave Hitchcock